Carcano is the frequently used name for a series of Italian bolt-action, internal clip fed, repeating military rifles and carbines. Introduced in 1891, this rifle was chambered for the rimless 6.5×52mm Carcano round (Cartuccia Modello 1895). It was developed by the chief technician Salvatore Carcano at the Turin Army Arsenal in 1890, and was originally called the Modello (model) 91 or simply M91. Successively replacing the previous Vetterli-Vitali rifles and carbines in 10.35×47mmR, it was produced from 1891 to 1945. The M91 was used in both rifle (fucile) and shorter-barreled carbine (moschetto) form by most Italian troops during World War I and by Italian and some German forces during World War II. The rifle was also used during the Winter War by Finland, and again by regular and irregular forces in Syria, Libya, Tunisia and Algeria during various postwar conflicts in those countries.

The Type I Carcano rifle was produced by Italy for the Japanese Empire prior to World War II. After the invasion of China, all Arisaka production was required for use of the Imperial Army, so the Imperial Navy contracted with Italy for this weapon in 1937. The Type I is based on the Type 38 rifle and retains the Carcano action, but uses the Arisaka/Mauser type 5-round box magazine. The Type I was used primarily by Japanese Imperial Naval Forces and was chambered for the Japanese 6.5×50mm Arisaka cartridge. Approximately 60,000 Type I rifles were produced by Italian arsenals for Japan.

A Carcano M38 was used by Lee Harvey Oswald to assassinate United States President John F. Kennedy on November 22, 1963, in Dallas, Texas.

History
Although this rifle is often called "Mannlicher–Carcano", especially in American parlance, neither that designation nor the name "Mauser–Parravicino" is correct. Its official designation in Italian is simply Modello 1891, or M91 ("il novantuno"). The magazine system uses en bloc charger clips which were originally developed and patented by Ferdinand Mannlicher, but the actual shape and design of the Carcano clip is derived from the German Model 1888 Commission Rifle.

Until 1938, all M91 rifles and carbines were chambered for the rimless 6.5×52mm Modello 1895 cartridge, using a round-nose metal case bullet of 160 grains weight at approximately 2,000–2,400 ft/s muzzle velocity, depending upon barrel length. At least one small arms authority noted inconsistencies in powder types in arsenal-loaded 6.5×52mm military ammunition, often with different powder types and ammunition lots intermixed within a single clip of ammunition. The practice of intermixing powder types and ammunition lots in clipped rifle ammunition was generally avoided by arsenals of other nations, as it frequently resulted in varying bullet velocities and excessive bullet dispersion on the target.

After reports of inadequate performance at both short and long ranges during the campaigns in Italian North Africa (1924–1934), and the Second Italo-Abyssinian War (1934), the Italian army introduced a new short rifle in 1938, the Modello 1938, together with a new cartridge in 7.35×51mm caliber. In addition to the slightly larger caliber, Italian ordnance designers introduced a spitzer-type bullet for the new cartridge, with the tip filled with aluminum to produce an unstable (tumbling) projectile upon impact in soft tissue (a design most likely copied from the .303 British Mk VII bullet).

However, the Italian government was unable to successfully mass-produce the new arms in adequate quantities before the onset of war, and in 1940, all rifle and ammunition production reverted to 6.5 mm, but no 7.35 mm Mod. 38 rifles nor carbines were ever re-barrelled to the old 6.5×52mm caliber. Some Italian troops serving on the Russian front were armed with 7.35 mm Mod. 1938 rifles, but exchanged them in 1942 for 6.5×52 mm arms.

Approximately 94,500 7.35mm Modello 1938 rifles were shipped to Finland, where they were known as Terni carbines (from the Terni stamp with the royal crown, the logo or seal of the Regia fabbrica d’armi di Terni arsenal where they were manufactured). They were primarily used by security and line-of-communications troops during the Winter War of 1939–1940, though some frontline troops were issued the weapon. According to reports, the Finns disliked the rifle. With its non-standard 7.35 mm caliber, it was problematic to keep frontline troops supplied with good quality, or any ammunition at all, and its non-adjustable rear sight (fixed for 200 m) made it ill-suited for use in precision shooting at the varied ranges encountered by Finnish soldiers during the conflict. Despite this, it's worth noticing that the Finns themselves modified the fixed optics on the rifle to operate from a range of 200 m to only 150 m. Whenever possible, Finnish soldiers discarded the weapon in favor of rifles acquired on the battlefield, including standard models of captured Soviet-made Mosin–Nagant rifles. The latter had the advantage of using commonly available 7.62×54mmR ammunition. By the outbreak of the Continuation War, the remaining Mod. 1938 7.35 mm rifles were issued to the Finnish Navy, as well as anti-aircraft, coastal defense, and other second-line (home front) troops.

In 1941, the Italian military returned to a long-barrelled infantry rifle once again (slightly shorter than the original M91), the Carcano M91/41. True sniper versions never existed, but in World War I a few rifles were fitted with telescopic lenses and issued for service use (World War II scoped rifles were strictly prototypes).

Several lots of Moschetti M91/38 TS (special troops' carbines) were chambered for the German 8×57mm Mauser sS heavy ball round. This modification entered service in 1943, just before the Italian capitulation. Two small batches of Moschetti M91/38 TS carbines shows barrels marked 1938 and 1941, but they were not used at these times with any Italian forces, and their peculiar serial numbering suggests that these might just be rebored unused surplus barrels that were converted with other ones after 1945. Many 7.92 mm Carcano carbines were apparently exported to Egypt after World War II, where they served as drill and training carbines. Several also bear Israeli armed forces markings. The occasionally used model moniker "Model 1943 (M43)" for these converted 7.92mm rifles is wrong, as they were never so designated by the Italian military.

German forces captured large quantities of Carcanos after Italy's capitulation in September 1943. It was the most commonly issued rifle to the German Volkssturm ("People's Militia") units in late 1944 and 1945.

After World War II, Italy replaced its Carcano rifles first with British Lee–Enfields and then with the US .30 caliber (7.62 mm) M1 Garand semi-automatic rifle, which the Italians labeled the 'Model 1952 (M52). Finland sold all of its approximately 74,000 remaining 7.35 mm M91/38 Carcano rifles on the surplus market. As a consequence, large quantities of surplus Carcanos were sold in the United States and Canada beginning in the 1950s. In Italy, the Polizia di Stato and the Carabinieri retained the Moschetto 38 TS, retiring it from service in 1981. Captured 6.5mm Carcano rifles were used by Greek forces post-war, with ammunition supplied by U.S. Western Cartridge Co. Some were also converted to 6.5×54mm Mannlicher–Schönauer, one of the standard cartridges of the Greek military at the time.

During the Libyan Civil War in 2011, many rebels went into battle with their personally-owned weapons, including old bolt-action rifles and shotguns. Of these, Carcano-style rifles and carbines have been the most frequently observed style of bolt-action rifle. They were predominantly used by rebels in the Nafusa Mountains. These old weapons saw combat once again due to the rebels' limited access to modern firearms. Additionally, some Libyan rebels preferred to use their familiar hunting weapons over the more modern, yet unfamiliar, assault rifles available. According to Al-Fitouri Muftah, a member of the rebel military council overseeing the western mountain front, as many as 1 in 10 rebels in the region were armed with World War II-era weapons.

Variants
All variants used the same Carcano bolt action, fed by an en-bloc clip; the rifles and carbines had different barrel lengths and differences in stocks and sights depending on barrel length. As noted in the introduction, the word moschetto means literally "musket" but was used generally by Italian arms makers as a descriptor of Italian 20th century rifles, often shorter-barrelled rifles in the carbine style meant for other than regular infantry uses. Regular length infantry rifles are named as fucile models.

Fucile Modello 1891 (Rifle Model 1891), 6,5x52 mm with detachable knife bayonet, 30.7 inch barrel, these were adopted on 29 March 1892 as per Ministerial Act No. 57 
 Moschetto Modello 1891 (Musketoon Model 1891) 6,5×52mm with integral folding bayonet, 17.7 inch barrel, these were adopted on 9 June 1893 and under Act No. 116 dated of 15 July 1893 is when the nomenclature became official. These have been referenced as ‘for Cavalry’ (per Cavalleria) carbines in both English and Italian lingo however, it is incorrect and no such name has ever been used that called them as such. These were initially made to be issued to Cavalry Troops but were however issued to other troops as well such as the Carabinieri Reali, Bersaglieri Ciclisti, and later to the Paratroopers and the MVSN Troops. Initially these models did not have handguards on them but were added to them as per Circular No.400 dated June 30, 1916. They modified or manufactured new made nose caps for these with a little tab on the top of them to fit the handguard into. As part of this modification process they also had to modify the rear sight assembly on the back where the handguard fit into it. These were made from 1893 well up to 1944, the easiest way to say these are such models is they all have the adjustable rear sight, no matter by which manufacturer made them or what year they were manufactured,
Moschetto per Truppe Speciali Modello 1891 (Musketoon for Special Troops Model 1891), 6,5x52 mm with side mounted type (transverse) bayonet, 17.7 barrel, on 6 January 1900 under Act No.6 these firearms were officially called as such models even though production of these  were started in 1898. These were issued to machine gun, mortar and motorcycle crews. These had slings swivels on the bottom of the buttstock and on the nose cap. There two types of handguards and nose caps used on the models, the first was the type where the handguard was not retained by a little tab on the nose cap on the top of them but it was found that these could come off so as per Circular No.124 dated February 25, 1916 they decided to add the little tab to keep them in place.
Moschetto Modello 1891/ 1924 (Musketoon Model 1891 / 1924), 6,5×52 mm, 17.7 inch barrel, In 1925 they started conversion of the Fuclie Modello 1891 to be shortened as per Circular No. 59 dated January 29, 1925 which specifically says the nomenclature of this firearm shall be 'moschetto mod. 91/24'. The easiest way to tell this model is that it has the longer adjustable rear sight of the rifle on it, these did not have the smaller shorter adjustable rear sights.
Moschetto per Truppe Speciali Modello 1891 Modificato (Musketoon for Special Troops Model 1891 Modified), 6,5x52 mm, 17.7 inch barrel, There were several changes in different years of these in the sling configurations and bayonet mount on the nose cap. They either kept the original sling configuration, got rid of the one the buttstock and filled it in with wood and the one on the nose cap was also removed. They added a sling bar to the left side on the buttstock and on the left side of the stock. They also later decided to use both type of sling configurations on them. The nose caps for these were configured to use the standard 1891 rifle bayonet instead of the side mounted type and in some cases the original nose cap was replaced with the type used on the 1891 / 1924 and using a barrel band they utilized. These have been called as 91/28 models, in no such way, shape or form were these ever called as 91/28's, there was a Moschetto Modello 1891 / 1928 model but it was specifically used as the nomenclature of the rifle that was designed to use the Tromblonico grenade launcher. They specifically in the different circulars they wrote on the modification of these firearms, use the word modificato or T.S. modificato, nowhere are they referred to as 91/28's.
 Moschetto per Truppe Speciali con Tromboncino (con Tromboncino, with grenade launcher) Mod. 91/28 (modified 91/28 coupled with a 38.5 mm grenade launcher) 17.7 inch barrel.
 Fucile di Fanteria Mod. 1938 ("infantry rifle" Model 1938, adopted in 1938 in 7.35×51mm caliber, fixed sights,  detachable folding knife bayonet) 20.9 inch barrel.

 Moschettos (carbines) Mod. 1938 (folding bayonet) and Mod. 1938 TS (detachable bayonet) carbine versions of Model 1938 short rifle in 7.35×51mm, later reverted to 6.5x52mm, 17.7 inch barrel.
 Fucile di Fanteria Mod. 91/38 (Model 1938 "infantry rifle" chambered in 6.5×52mm caliber since 1940). The barrel is the 20.9 inch barrel of the earlier 7.35 mm caliber, but now changed to 6.5 mm. Unlike the slightly shorter and lighter TS Moschetto, it also has both sling swivels on the left side of the stock, not visible from the right side of the rifle, identifying it as a Fucile di Fanteria type. This is the model (stamped "1940" to show manufacture date) owned by Lee Harvey Oswald and determined to be the John F. Kennedy assassination rifle. From 1940, the Moschetto Mod. 1938 and Mod. 1938 TS were also made in 6.5×52mm.
 Fucile di Fanteria Mod. 91/41 (6.5×52mm "infantry rifle" adopted in 1941, adjustable sights), 27.2 inch barrel.
 Type I Rifle (6.5×50mm infantry rifle, produced as export for the Imperial Japanese Navy, and had adjustable sights)

Users

: Captured during World War I, about 49,500 were converted to use the available 6.5×54mm Mannlicher–Schönauer cartridges.
: After Italy's surrender the Germans seized a number of Carcanos and issued them to the Bulgarians

: captured from the Italian forces in 1896 or acquired after World War I. Still in use with irregular forces in the 1950s.

, used during Indonesian National Revolution , limited use due to scarcity of ammunition 

: Purchased the Type I Rifle on contract.

 : People's Movement for the Liberation of Azawad

 : The British sent captured Carcanos to the Royal Netherlands East Indies Army

: Approximately 100,000 purchased during the 1920s, prior to the Northern Expedition. At least 15,000 were captured by the Japanese in Fujian. These would then be sold to the Nanjing Army.

: In 1921 the Kingdom had about 11,000 Italian M91 rifles in stock. In the start of the 1920s it was proposed these be exchanged for Mauser rifles with the Kingdom of Italy. The proposition was declined in 1922 and these rifles remained in Yugoslav hands until 1941. The Yugoslav Partisans also used captured M91 and M91/38 rifles and carbines.

: M91 carbines used after the 1946 Syrian independence
 : M91 rifles used by the Neo Destour
 : Purchased M38 rifles manufactured post-WWII and chambered for 8mm Mauser.

Kennedy assassination rifle

In March 1963, Lee Harvey Oswald purchased a "6.5 [mm] Italian carbine", later improperly called a Mannlicher–Carcano (although it uses a Mannlicher-style en bloc clip system), through mail order, for $19.95 ($183.90 in 2022 dollars). The advertisement only specified a "6.5 Italian Carbine" and actually shows a Carcano model M91 TS, which was the  Carcano carbine model sold through the ad when it was originally placed. However, from a time 11 months before Oswald placed his order, the Chicago sporting goods store from which he purchased it had been shipping the slightly longer  Model 91/38 under the same ad, and this is the weapon Oswald received.

On 22 November 1963, Oswald used this weapon to assassinate U.S. President John F. Kennedy. The rifle, made in the Terni arsenal in 1940 and bearing the serial number C2766, was equipped for an extra $7 with a new 4x18 Japanese telescopic sight, on a sheet metal side mount. It was later scrutinized by local police, the FBI, the U. S. Army and two federal commissions. Shooting tests, conducted by those groups and others using the original rifle or similar models, addressed questions about the speed and accuracy with which the Carcano could be fired. Following lawsuits over its ownership, the rifle ended up in storage at the National Archives. The assassination was one of the factors leading to passage of the Gun Control Act of 1968, which banned mail order sales of firearms.

See also
List of common World War II infantry weapons

Notes

External links

Carcano Model Identification
Modern Firearms
Italian page on Carcanos
Carcano M38 cal.7.35x51mm shooting (video); close-up (video)

8 mm firearms
Bolt-action rifles of Italy
Assassination of John F. Kennedy
World War I Italian infantry weapons
World War II infantry weapons of Italy
Weapons and ammunition introduced in 1891
World War II rifles